Meena Durairaj (born 16 September 1976), known professionally as Meena, is an Indian actress who predominantly works in the South Indian film industry as well as Hindi cinema. 
Meena has acted in Tamil, Telugu, Malayalam, Kannada, and Hindi films. In addition to acting, Meena is also a playback singer, TV judge, and occasional dubbing artist. She has received numerous accolades, including two Filmfare Awards South, three Tamil Nadu State Film Awards, two Nandi Award for Best Actress and Cinema Express Awards. In 1998, she was honoured with the Kalaimamani Award by Government of Tamil Nadu.

Early life
Meena was born in 1976 and was brought up in Chennai (then Madras), Tamil Nadu. Her mother Rajamallika from Kannur district of Kerala while her father Durairaj is from Andhra.

Career

Child artist
Meena started her career in 1982 as a child artist in the film Nenjangal, featuring Sivaji Ganesan in the lead role after he saw her at a birthday party. She has acted in several films along with Ganesan as a child artist. She has acted with Rajinikanth in two movies namely Enkeyo Ketta Kural and Anbulla Rajinikanth as a child artist. Anbulla Rajinikanth, in which she acted as a terminally ill child who warms up to
Rajinikanth —that became a major pointer in her career growth. Her debut in Malayalam as a child artist was in the movie Oru Kochukatha Aarum Parayatha Katha, directed by P.G. Viswambharan. She appeared in over 45 films as a child.

Lead female roles
Meena has been one of the top star pairing up with every big star down South. She made her debut in Telugu beside Rajendra Prasad in Navayugam in 1990. While her Tamil admission as a heroine was in Oru Pudhiya Kadhai in the same year. Her first break was through Tamil film En Rasavin Manasile (1991) opposite Rajkiran, which was directed by Kasthuri Raja. Meena's portrayal as Solaiyamma won her fans' hearts. Later, the movie was remade in Telugu as Moratodu Naa Mogudu (1992) with Meena reprising her role.

Meena starred in the Malayalam industry with the movie Santhwanam (1991) where she played as Suresh Gopi's daughter in the film released in 1991. Its success attracted more roles with senior Malayalam heroes. Meena has expressed a wish to do more films in Malayalam.

Telugu film Chanti (1992), opposite Venkatesh was nominated for Filmfare Award for Best Actress – Telugu and the movie was a big hit at the box office. 
She made her Bollywood debut opposite Chunky Pandey in the film Parda Hai Parda (1992). This was followed by Allari Pilla (1992), directed by Kodi Ramakrishna. Allari Mogudu (1992) and Sundarakanda (1992), both directed by K. Raghavendra Rao. President Gari Pellam (1992) with Nagarjuna, directed by A. Kodandarami Reddy.

In 1993, another film was Rajeswari Kalyanam, directed by Kranthi Kumar. She won Nandi Award for Best Actress for her performance. She followed it up with films like Muta Mesthri and Yejaman. This performance won her the Tamil Nadu State Film Award for Best Actress.  She plays Sudha, a smart and intelligent young wife in Abbaigaru. She also appeared in the comedy film Allari Alludu.

In 1994, she has acted in P. Vasu's Sethupathi IPS co-starring Vijayakanth. In her follow-up movie again with Rajinikanth in Veera and Muthu (1995). Followed by movies as Maaman Magal (1995), Sengottai (1996) and Avvai Shanmugi (1996).

She debuted in Malayalam as a lead actress with the 1997 release Varnapakittu, where in she romance with Mohanlal on screen. Later the duo was paired in Olympian Anthony Adam (1999), Mr. Brahmachari (2003), Natturajavu (2004), Udayananu Tharam (2005) and Chandrolsavam (2005) among others.

Venkatesh and Meena, in particular, were a popular pair in Telugu cinema. 

In 2000, her role in Rhythm won her the Best Actress award at the Cinema Express Awards.

Meena's releases in 2009 were Mariyadhai with Vijayakanth, directed by Vikraman. Katha, Samvidhanam: Kunchacko with Sreenivasan. She played in Telugu as Saint Vengamamba in Tarigonda Vengamamba, directed by Uday Bhaskar.

Return to films 
In 2010, Meena returns to the big screen with the Kannada film Hendtheer Darbar. This was her first film after her marriage. 
In 2011, she played the role of Narain's sister in the film Thambikottai.

Meena returned to Malayalam cinema played the role of wife to Mohanlal in Drishyam (2013) and Balyakalasakhi alongside Mammootty. She reprised her role in the 2014 Telugu remake, Drushyam. Meena returned to Tamil cinema in Annaatthe (2021) with Rajinikanth.

Other work

Music composing
Meena has been a playback singer for some albums with actor Manoj. Also she has been a playback singer in two pop albums called 16 Vayathinile, and Kadhalism, which she began recording in 2001 with actor Vikram.

Dubbing
Meena dubbed for Padmapriya Janakiraman in Cheran's movie Pokkisham.

Personal life 
Meena married Vidyasagar, a Bangalore-based software engineer, on 12 July 2009 at Arya Vysya Samaj Kalyana Mandapam. The couple later visited Tirumala Venkateswara Temple, Andhra Pradesh. The couple came back to Chennai to hold a reception at Mayor Ramanathan Chettiar Hall, in which all leading southern Indian actors participated. The couple has a daughter Nainika who made her acting debut at the age of 5 in the film Theri (2016). Vidyasagar died on 28 June 2022 due to lung related ailments.

Filmography

Film

Television

Awards and nominations

References

External links
 
 

Living people
Actresses in Malayalam cinema
Child actresses in Malayalam cinema
Actresses in Telugu cinema
Actresses in Kannada cinema
Indian film actresses
Indian television actresses
Tamil Nadu State Film Awards winners
Filmfare Awards South winners
Nandi Award winners
Recipients of the Kalaimamani Award
21st-century Indian actresses
Indian child actresses
20th-century Indian actresses
Year of birth unknown
1976 births